Hans Jamnig (1 June 1912 – 2 February 1991) was an Austrian cross-country skier. He competed in the men's 18 kilometre event at the 1936 Winter Olympics.

References

1912 births
1991 deaths
Austrian male cross-country skiers
Olympic cross-country skiers of Austria
Cross-country skiers at the 1936 Winter Olympics
Sportspeople from Innsbruck
20th-century Austrian people